Jelena Janković was the defending champion, but lost in the quarterfinals to Vera Zvonareva.

Serena Williams won the title, defeating Zvonareva in the final 6–4, 3–6, 6–3. This was Williams' third successive title in the 2008 season, and was the first time she had won a clay court tournament since the 2002 French Open.

Seeds
The top 8 seeds received a bye into the second round.

Draw

Key
 Q = Qualifier
 WC = Wild card
 LL = Lucky loser
 w/o = Walkover
 r = Retired

Finals

Top half

Section 1

Section 2

Bottom half

Section 3

Section 4

References

2008
2008 WTA Tour